Tordenskiold was the name of two dignities in the Danish and the Norwegian nobility. Both are today patrilineally extinct.

Tordenskiold I
Peter Jansen Wessel was a Norwegian/Danish naval hero who for his braveness was ennobled under the name Tordenskiold. It happened by letter of nobility on 24 February 1716. Peter Tordenskiold died in a young age and without issue, wherefore this noble dignity became extinct.

Peter Tordenskiold's brother  was in 1720 ennobled under the name von Wessel.

Tordenskiold II
Peter Tordenskiold's nephew Johan Christopher Christophersen Wessel (born on 4 July 1727, died on 6 February 1793) was later, in 1761, ennobled under the same name and with the same arms as his uncle.

Johan Christopher Tordenskiold was the son of Christopher Jansen Wessel and Karen Nielsdatter Bie. He was married and had issue.

See also
 Danish nobility
 Norwegian nobility

Literature and sources
 Wikipedia, English: Peter Tordenskjold (Per 12 April 2011.)
 Wikipedia, Danish: Peter Wessel Tordenskiold (Per 12 April 2011.)
 Wikipedia, Norwegian Bokmål & Riksmål: Peter Wessel (Per 12 April 2011.)
 Wikipedia, Norwegian Bokmål & Riksmål: Wessel (slekt) (Per 12 April 2011.)
 Store norske leksikon: Peter Wessel Tordenskiold
 Store norske leksikon Peter Wessel Tordenskiold – utdypning

Danish noble families
Norwegian noble families